Between Dog and Wolf is the 12th studio album by British rock band New Model Army, released on 30 September 2013 by Attack Attack Records.

Background

Between Dog and Wolf is the first New Model Army album with new bass player Ceri Monger, replacing Nelson who left after 22 years in the band. The self-produced set was finished in 2013 in Los Angeles and co-produced by Joe Barresi.

It was the first New Model Army to chart in the UK Top 40 Album Chart since The Love of Hopeless Causes in 1993, peaking at No. 34 in October 2013.

Critical reception

On the Metacritic website, which aggregates reviews from critics and assigns a normalised rating out of 100, Between Dog and Wolf received a score of 73, based on 12 mixed and 4 positive reviews. Record Collector called it "a record of striking primal force", praising new bass player Monger's "expressive grooves". The review in Mojo describes "a marked directional change away from ragged punk" in the sound of the album, praising new-found "temperance and restraint" and calling Between Dog and Wolf "something of a late-in-the-day career high".

Track listing
All tracks written by New Model Army

"Horsemen" – 4:09	 
"March in September" – 4:01
"Seven Times" – 3:22
"Did You Make It Safe?" – 3:28
"I Need More Time" – 4:50
"Pull the Sun" – 5:25
"Lean Back and Fall" – 3:58
"Knievel" – 3:16
"Stormclouds" – 3:40
"Between Dog and Wolf" – 6:27
"Qasr El Nil Bridge	" – 6:59
"Tomorrow Came" –	 4:09
"Summer Moors" – 4:20
"Ghosts" – 5:29

Personnel

New Model Army
Justin Sullivan – vocals, guitar, keyboards, harmonica
Ceri Monger – bass, percussion, dulcimer, backing vocals
Michael Dean – drums, percussion, backing vocals
Dean White – keyboards, guitar, backing vocals, percussion
Marshall Gill – guitar, percussion, backing vocals

Guest musicians

Jade Doherty – layered gospel vocals
Tobias Unterberg – cello
Tom Moth – harp
Charlotte Woods – euphonium, trombone
Will Blackstone – flugelhorn
Chris Powell – cornet, flugelhorn

Production
Justin Sullivan – producer, recorded by
Michael Dean – producer, recorded by
Dean White – producer, recorded by

Chart performance

References

External links
Official NMA website

New Model Army (band) albums
2013 albums